RNA-binding protein 6 is a protein that in humans is encoded by the RBM6 gene. RBM6 orthologs have been identified in all mammals for which complete genome data are available.

References

Further reading

External links